Dr. Bunkong Tuon  was born several years before the Khmer Rouge takeover in Cambodia  and, in 1979, left with his extended family for the Thailand-Cambodia,  where he spent several years in refugee camps before immigrating to the  United States in 1982.  He earned a BA in Comparative Literature from  CSULB in 2000, and a MA and a PhD, also in Comparative Literature, from the University of Massachusetts in 2008.  His research interests are in the fields of Asian American studies, Southeast Asian American literature and history, trauma studies, testimonial discourse,  creative writing, translation theory and practice, and folklore studies.

At Union College, he teaches courses in Asian-American literature and history, Southeast Asian American literature and history, the Viet Nam War, ethnic literature, and Kingston & Morrison.   His articles on Southeast Asian American authors, the Vietnam War, and translation studies are published in MELUS, Mosaic, Comparative Literature Studies, Children's Literature Association Quarterly, Postcolonial Text, Pedagogy, and Culture and Poetics. In addition to his scholarship on  Southeast Asian-American literature and history, he also publishes creative nonfiction and poetry. His publications include Nerve Cowboy, Mas Tequila Review, Silver Birch Press, Chiron Review, New York Quarterly, and Patterson Literary Review. Gruel, his first full-length collection was released by NYQ Press in 2015. His second collection was released in 2017, entitled And So I Was Blessed.

References

External links
 Bunkong Tuon at Union College
 I Never Knew How To Thank You: Poems — Bunkong Tuon
 Bunkong Tuon at New York Quarterly Books

Living people
1979 births